The Basel Mission was a Christian missionary society based in Switzerland.

History 

From the outset the society set out to be Protestant but non-denominational. Arising from concerns about what would happen if Napoleon managed to seize the city of Basel, both Calvinists from Basel and Lutherans from Württemberg made a holy vow to establish the seminary if the city was spared. The Basel mission was the result. The first president of the society was the Reverend Nikolaus von Brunn.

The mission was founded as the German Missionary Society in 1815. The mission later changed its name to the Basel Evangelical Missionary Society, and finally the Basel Mission. The society built a school to train Dutch and British missionaries in 1816. Since this time, the mission has worked in Russia and the Gold Coast (Ghana) from 1828, India from 1834, China from 1847, Cameroon from 1886, Borneo from 1921, Nigeria from 1951, and Latin America and the Sudan from 1972 and 1973. On 18 December 1828, the Basel Mission Society, coordinating with the Danish Missionary Society, sent its first missionaries, Johannes Phillip Henke, Gottlieb Holzwarth, Carl Friedrich Salbach and Johannes Gottlieb Schmid, to take up work in the Danish Protectorate at Christiansborg, Gold Coast. On 21 March 1832, a second group of missionaries including Andreas Riis, Peter Peterson Jäger, and Christian Heinze, the first mission doctor, arrived on the Gold Coast only to discover that Henke had died four months earlier.

A major focus for the Basel Mission was to create employment opportunities for the people of the area where each mission is located. To this end the society taught printing, tile manufacturing, and weaving, and employed people in these fields. The Basel Mission tile factory in Mangalore, India, is such an endeavour. The organization gave a high priority to uplifting the role of native women, and used women missionaries as role models of what Christian womanhood ought to be.

In West Africa, the Basel Mission had a small budget and depended on child labour for many routine operations such as daily household chores. The children were pupils in the mission schools who split their time between general education, religious studies, and unpaid labour. The Basel Mission made it a priority to alleviate the harsh conditions of child labour imposed by slavery, and the debt bondage of their parents.

The Basel Mission initially tried to print evangelical material in Bombay but this was laborious. In 1841, Gottfried Weigle obtained a printing press from Bombay and brought it back to Mangalore in 1842 with two Marathi printing assistants. The printing press was named as Basel Mission Press In 1842, they published a Kannada pamphlet by Moegling and made 1500 copies. The next item was Christian Greiner's Tulu translation of St. Matthew's Gospel. In July 1843, the press began the first Kannada newspaper called "Mangalur-samachar" edited by Hermann Moegling. Two issues a month were produced until February 1844, after which it was printed in Bellary.

Recent activities
Since World War II, the mission has operated abroad via local church congregations. As of November 2002, the major countries or regions of operation were Bolivia, Cameroon, Chile, Hong Kong, the Democratic Republic of the Congo, Indonesia, Malaysia, Nigeria, Peru, Singapore, Sudan and Taiwan.

Basel Mission Seminary 
The Basel Mission Training Institution (BMTI) partnered for some time with the Anglican Church Mission Society. Important missionaries to Palestine like Bishop Samuel Gobat and John Zeller were trained at the seminary. The first inspector (director) of the institute was Stuttgart native Christian Gottlieb Blumhardt (1779-1838). The curriculum covered four core areas:

 Theology –  Bible Studies, Bible Passages, Biblical History, Pastoral Care, Old Testament, Old Testament Exegesis, New Testament, New Testament Passages, Faith and Morality, Patristics, Dogmatics, Systematic Theology, History of Christianity, Scriptures for Homiletic Use, Basic Homiletics (Preaching), Catechesis, Mission History, Methods of Missionising, Church History and World History
 Linguistics – Philology (study of languages), Hebrew, Greek, Latin, German, English and Dutch Grammar
 Skills Training – Arithmetic, Calligraphy, Orthography (writing and spelling skills), Rhetoric and Correspondence, Map-making/Cartography, non-European geography, Geography, Anatomy, Basic medicine, Surgery, Botany, Logic/Philosophy and Useful knowledge (integrated Physics, Chemistry and Mathematics)
 Supplementary Instructions – Parish record-keeping, Interacting with Catholic missions, Drawing, Music, Singing, Reading and Technical drawing/Civil engineering

Inspectors of the Basel Mission 
The following ordained ministers served as the Inspector or Director of the Basel Mission:

Notable individuals affiliated to the Basel Mission

See also

Protestant missionary societies in China during the 19th Century
 History of Ghana

References

Further reading
 Antwi, Daniel J. "The African Factor in Christian Mission to Africa: A Study of Moravian and Basel Mission Activities in Ghana." International Review of Mission 87.344 (1998): 55+. online
Brick, Caroline (November 2002). "Basel Mission Records". Mundus: Gateway to missionary collections in the United Kingdom. Accessed 17 November 2006.
 Grant, Paul. "Strangers and Neighbors in Precolonial Ghana" ‘'Fides et Historia.'’ (2018) 50 (2): 94–107. 
 Koonar, Catherine.   "Using child labor to save souls: the Basel Mission in colonial Ghana, 1855–1900." ‘'Atlantic Studies'’ 11.4 (2014): 536–554.
 Miller, Jon.  Missionary Zeal and Institutional Control: Organizational Contradictions in the Basel Mission on the Gold Coast 1828-1917 (Routledge, 2014).
Quartey, Seth. Missionary Practices on the Gold Coast, 1832–1895: Discourse, Gaze and Gender in the Basel Mission in Pre-Colonial West Africa. Youngstown, New York: Cambria Press, 2007.
 Shetty, Parinitha. "Missionary pedagogy and Christianisation of the heathens: The educational institutions introduced by the Basel Mission in Mangalore." Indian Economic & Social History Review 45.4 (2008): 509–551.
 Sill, Ulrike. Encounters in quest of Christian womanhood: The Basel mission in pre-and early colonial Ghana'' (Brill, 2010).

External links
Basel Mission Archives
USC Digital Library

Religious organizations established in 1815
Christian missionary societies
Christian organizations established in the 19th century
History of Mangalore
1815 establishments in Germany
Evangelical missionary societies
Organisations based in Basel